Trewollock is a hamlet north of Gorran Haven, Cornwall, England, United Kingdom.

References

Hamlets in Cornwall